Recovery Toolbox is a collection of utilities and online services for recovering corrupted files, file formats, and repairing passwords for various programs.

Free utilities 
Recovery Toolbox for CD Free
 
Free tool for repairing data from compact discs that have been physically damaged (scratched, exposed to liquids, etc.) or are affected by system errors.
 
Recovery Toolbox File Undelete Free
 
Free tool for repairing deleted files in the Windows operating system. It supports the NTFS file system, but it doesn't  support recovery of data stored on high performance disks (SSD).

Shareware utilities 
Recovery Toolbox for Flash
 
Repairs deleted files from various storage media with FAT file systems, including SD, CF, MMC and other memory cards, smart media cards, IBM MicroDrives, Flash and USB drives, digital cameras, and floppy disks.
 
Recovery Toolbox for RAR
 
Repairs data from damaged RAR archives. Supports all existing RAR formats and compression ratios, password-protected archives, and archives stored on corrupted media.
 
Recovery Toolbox for Excel
 
Repairs corrupted Microsoft Excel files. Supports most tabular data, styles, fonts, sheets, formulas, functions, cell colors, borders, etc.
 
Recovery Toolbox for Outlook
 
Fixes errors encountered when working with Microsoft Outlook and repairs data such as emails, contacts, reminders, meetings, tasks, notes, calendar entries, logs, and other data from corrupted PST and OST files.

Web services 
In addition to working as a specialized installed tool, Recovery Toolbox supports data repair via web services such as:
 
 Adobe file formats: PDF documents and presentations (Adobe Acrobat/PDF Reader), AI image files (Adobe Illustrator), and PSD project files (Adobe Photoshop)
 Microsoft Office file formats: Excel spreadsheets, Word documents (including RTF), PowerPoint presentations, Project files; and email formats: PST and OST (Outlook), and DBX(Outlook Express)
 Other image file formats: DWG (AutoCAD) and CDR (CorelDraw)
 Database formats: ACCDB and MDB (Access), DBF (FoxPro/Clipper/dBase, etc.)

About developer 
Recovery Toolbox, Inc. is an IT company which has been developing software for repairing damaged files since 2003. To date, solutions have been developed to repair corrupted files of more than 30 different types, including extensions created with Microsoft Office software (such as Outlook and Excel) and data stored on various drives (hard disk drives, portable devices, CD/DVD, etc.).

References 

2003 software
Utility software
Computer memory
Windows software
System software
Recovery
Data recovery
Data recovery software
Data recovery companies